Democratization, or democratisation, is the transition to a more democratic political regime, including substantive political changes moving in a democratic direction. It may be a hybrid regime in transition from an authoritarian regime to a full democracy, a transition from an authoritarian political system to a semi-democracy or transition from a semi-authoritarian political system to a democratic political system. The opposite process is known as democratic backsliding or autocratization.

The outcome may be consolidated (as it was for example in the United Kingdom) or democratization may face frequent reversals (as happened in Chile). Different patterns of democratization are often used to explain other political phenomena, such as whether a country goes to a war or whether its economy grows.

Whether and to what extent democratization occurs has been attributed to various factors, including economic development, historical legacies, civil society, and international processes. Some accounts of democratization emphasize how elites drove democratization, whereas other accounts emphasize grassroots bottom-up processes.

However, classifying a nation as a ‘democracy’ or headed towards democratization is not a simple process. Various political scientists, historians, and others have argued that the process towards democracy is multifaceted – and that classifying a nation as undergoing a process of ‘democratization’ can have harmful repercussions. Thomas Carothers argues that countries undergoing a shift from authoritarianism does not imply (as traditionally considered through the idea of the ‘Transition Paradigm’) that they are undergoing democratization (Carothers, T. (2002). The end of the transition paradigm. Journal of Democracy). Furthermore, countries that undergo democratization do not necessarily become democracies – and fall into a “gray area” that involves aspects of democratization while simultaneously involving aspects of the previous authoritarian regime (Carothers, T. (2002). The end of the transition paradigm. Journal of Democracy). Following this concept, Renske Doorenspleet argues that for democratization to be properly applicable – the true meaning of democracy and authoritarianism must be defined for the specific context (Doorenspleet, R. (2011). Reassessing the Three Waves of Democratization. World Politics). A country can not claim to be undergoing democratization if it still presents severe human rights violations, poor state institutions, and other factors – regardless of its direction (and, according to Carothers, this direction will rarely be towards democracy)(Doorenspleet, R. (2011). Reassessing the Three Waves of Democratization. World Politics). Levitsky and Way present the concept of a fake democracy, called ‘competitive authoritarianism’ – also touched upon by Carothers, referred to by him as a façade/semi democracy – and argue that despite this resembling a democracy, it is not and cannot be recognized as one(Levitsky and Way, The New Competitive Authoritarianism 2020). They utilize the example of Hungary, which due to its general acceptance as a democracy led few observers to recognize its decline. This permitted the “Fidesz government, headed by Prime Minister  Viktor  Orbán,  [to use]  its  parliamentary  supermajority  to  tilt  the  political playing field” (Levitsky and Way, The New Competitive Authoritarianism 2020). Thus, classifying a façade / competitive authoritarianism regime democracy as a legitimate democracy is detrimental and results in misinformation regarding the specific country’s actual policies, along with promoting the potential rise of an authoritarian leader (Levitsky and Way, The New Competitive Authoritarianism 2020). Mamadou Diouf applies this concept to Africa, and discusses the further damage of the potential misclassification of countries undergoing democratization (Diouf, Autochthony and the Crisis of Citizenship: Democratization, Decentralization, and the Politics of Belonging, (2010). Raymond Hinnebusch further compliments the ideas presented by Diouf, and provides his examples to the context of the Middle East (Hinnebusch, R. Authoritarian persistence, democratization theory and the Middle East: An overview and critique. Democratization). Both authors argue that the theory of democratization is Westernized – and does not take other countries into account. Hinnebusch argues that with this Westernized view of democratization comes the potential emergence of various authoritarian regimes – particularly among ‘high-income oil states’ (Hinnebusch, R. Authoritarian persistence, democratization theory and the Middle East: An overview and critique. Democratization).

Therefore, as the concept of democratization is explored, bear in mind the variability of countries that are classified as undergoing the process of democratization, and be weary of the consequences of misclassified nations. The following examples presented in this Wikipedia page will not explore a façade democracy, but knowing the definition will help readers avoid the common misclassification.

Description 

Theories of democratization seek to explain a large macro-level change, the change in a political regime from dictatorship or authoritarianism to democracy. Some disagreements among scholars concern the concept of democracy. Other differences concern how to measure democracy - and what democracy index should be used.

Measures of democratization 

Some common democracy indices are V-Dem Democracy indices and Democracy Index. Democracy indices can distinguish between different high-level principles of democracy: electoral, liberal, participatory, deliberative, and egalitarian and other indicators. Democracy indices can be quantitative or categorical.

Waves of democratization 
One way to summarize the outcome theories of democratization seek to account is with the idea of waves of democratization

A wave of democratization refers to a major surge of democracy in history. And Samuel P. Huntington identified three waves of democratization that have taken place in history. The first one brought democracy to Western Europe and Northern America in the 19th century. It was followed by a rise of dictatorships during the Interwar period. The second wave began after World War II, but lost steam between 1962 and the mid-1970s. The latest wave began in 1974 and is still ongoing. Democratization of Latin America and the former Eastern Bloc is part of this third wave.

Waves of democratization can be followed by waves of de-democratization. Thus, Huntington, in 1991, offered the following depiction.

• First wave of democratization, 1828-1926

• First wave of de-democratization, 1922–42

• Second wave of democratization, 1943–62

• Second wave of de-democratization, 1958–75

• Third wave of democratization, 1974-

The idea of waves of democratization has also been used and scrutinized by many other authors, including Renske Doorenspleet, John Markoff, Seva Gunitsky, and Svend-Erik Skaaning.

According to Seva Gunitsky, from the 18th century to the Arab Spring (2011–2012), 13 democratic waves can be identified.

Historical cases 
The history of democracy shows that democractic development has often been slow, violent, and marked by frequent reversals.

Great Britain 
In Great Britain, there was renewed interest in Magna Carta in the 17th century. The Parliament of England enacted the Petition of Right in 1628 which established certain liberties for subjects. The English Civil War (1642–1651) was fought between the King and an oligarchic but elected Parliament, during which the idea of a political party took form with groups debating rights to political representation during the Putney Debates of 1647. Subsequently, the Protectorate (1653–59) and the English Restoration (1660) restored more autocratic rule although Parliament passed the Habeas Corpus Act in 1679, which strengthened the convention that forbade detention lacking sufficient cause or evidence. The Glorious Revolution in 1688 established a strong Parliament that passed the Bill of Rights 1689, which codified certain rights and liberties for individuals. It set out the requirement for regular parliaments, free elections, rules for freedom of speech in Parliament and limited the power of the monarch, ensuring that, unlike much of the rest of Europe, royal absolutism would not prevail. Only with the Representation of the People Act 1884 did a majority of the males get the vote.

United States of America 
The American Revolution (1775–1783) created the United States. The new Constitution established a relatively strong federal national government that included an executive, a national judiciary, and a bicameral Congress that represented states in the Senate and the population in the House of Representatives. In many fields, it was a success ideologically in the sense that a relatively true republic was established that never had a single dictator, but voting rights were initially restricted to white male property owners (about 6% of the population). Slavery was not abolished in the southern states until the constitutional Amendments of the Reconstruction era following the American Civil War (1861–1865) and the Civil Rights given to African-Americans were only achieved in the 1960s.

France 
The French Revolution (1789) briefly allowed a wide franchise. The French Revolutionary Wars and the Napoleonic Wars lasted for more than twenty years. The French Directory was more oligarchic. The First French Empire and the Bourbon Restoration restored more autocratic rule. The French Second Republic had universal male suffrage but was followed by the Second French Empire. The Franco-Prussian War (1870–71) resulted in the French Third Republic.

Germany 
Germany established its first democracy in 1919 with the creation of the Weimar Republic, a parliamentary republic created following the German Empire's defeat in World War I. The Weimar Republic lasted only 14 years before it collapsed and was replaced by Nazi dictatorship. Historians continue to debate the reasons why the Weimar Republic's attempt at democratization failed. After Germany was militarily defeated in World War II, democracy was reestablished in West Germany during the U.S.-led occupation which undertook the denazification of society.

Italy 
The Kingdom of Italy, after the unification of Italy in 1861, was a constitutional monarchy with the King having considerable powers. Italian Fascism created a dictatorship after the World War I. World War II resulted in the Italian Republic.

Japan 
In Japan, limited democratic reforms were introduced during the Meiji period (when the industrial modernization of Japan began), the Taishō period (1912–1926), and the early Shōwa period. Despite pro-democracy movements such as the Freedom and People's Rights Movement (1870s and 1880s) and some proto-democratic institutions, Japanese society remained constrained by a highly conservative society and bureaucracy. Historian Kent E. Calder notes that writers that "Meiji leadership embraced constitutional government with some pluralist features for essentially tactical reasons" and that pre-World war II Japanese society was dominated by a "loose coalition" of "landed rural elites, big business, and the military" that was averse to pluralism and reformism. While the Imperial Diet survived the impacts of Japanese militarism, the Great Depression, and the Pacific War, other pluralistic institutions, such as political parties, did not. After World War II, during the Allied occupation, Japan adopted a much more vigorous, pluralistic democracy.

Latin America 
Countries in Latin America became independent between 1810 and 1825, and soon had some early experiences with representative government and elections. All Latin American countries established representative institutions soon after independence, the early cases being those of Colombia in 1810, Paraguay and Venezuela in 1811, and Chile in 1818. Adam Przeworski shows that some experiments with representative institutions in Latin America occurred earlier than in most European countries. Mass democracy, in which the working class had the right to vote, become common only in the 1930s and 1940s.

Causes
There is considerable debate about the factors which affect (e.g., promote or limit) democratization. Economic, cultural, and historical factors have been cited as impacting on the process. So too have historical and international factors. Moreover, some arguments are more structural in nature, while others focus on leadership and agency. It is useful to order the various arguments under different headings.

Economic factors

Economic development and modernization theory 

Scholars such as Seymour Martin Lipset; Carles Boix and Susan Stokes, and Dietrich Rueschemeyer, Evelyne Stephens, and John Stephens argue that economic development increases the likelihood of democratization. Initially argued by Lipset in 1959, this subsequently been referred to as modernization theory. According to Daniel Treisman, there is "a strong and consistent relationship between higher income and both democratization and democratic survival in the medium term (10–20 years), but not necessarily in shorter time windows." Robert Dahl argued that market economies provided favorable conditions for democratic institutions.

A higher GDP/capita correlates with democracy and some claim the wealthiest democracies have never been observed to fall into authoritarianism. The rise of Hitler and of the Nazis in Weimar Germany can be seen as an obvious counter-example, but although in early 1930s Germany was already an advanced economy, by that time, the country was also living in a state of economic crisis virtually since the first World War (in the 1910s), a crisis which was eventually worsened by the effects of the Great Depression. There is also the general observation that democracy was very rare before the industrial revolution. Empirical research thus led many to believe that economic development either increases chances for a transition to democracy, or helps newly established democracies consolidate. One study finds that economic development prompts democratization but only in the medium run (10–20 years). This is because development may entrench the incumbent leader but make it more difficult for him deliver the state to a son or trusted aide when he exits. However, the debate about whether democracy is a consequence of wealth, a cause of it, or both processes are unrelated, is far from conclusive. Another study suggests that economic development depends on the political stability of a country to promote democracy. Clark, Robert and Golder, in their reformulation of Albert Hirschman's model of Exit, Voice and Loyalty, explain how it is not the increase of wealth in a country per se which influences a democratization process, but rather the changes in the socio-economic structures that come together with the increase of wealth. They explain how these structure changes have been called out to be one of the main reasons several European countries became democratic. When their socioeconomic structures shifted because modernization made the agriculture sector more efficient, bigger investments of time and resources were used for the manufacture and service sectors. In England, for example, members of the gentry began investing more on commercial activities that allowed them to become economically more important for the state. This new kind of productive activities came with new economic power were assets became more difficult for the state to count and hence more difficult to tax. Because of this, predation was no longer possible and the state had to negotiate with the new economic elites to extract revenue. A sustainable bargain had to be reached because the state became more dependent of its citizens remaining loyal and, with this, citizens had now leverage to be taken into account in the decision making process for the country.

Adam Przeworski and Fernando Limongi argue that while economic development makes democracies less likely to turn authoritarian, there is insufficient evidence to conclude that development causes democratization (turning an authoritarian state into a democracy). Economic development can boost public support for authoritarian regimes in the short-to-medium term. Andrew J. Nathan argues that China is a problematic case for the thesis that economic development causes democratization. Michael Miller finds that development increases the likelihood of "democratization in regimes that are fragile and unstable, but makes this fragility less likely to begin with."

There is research to suggest that greater urbanization, through various pathways, contributes to democratization. A 2016 study found that preferential trade agreements "encourage the democratization of a country, in particular if the PTA partners are themselves democracies."

Numerous scholars and political thinkers have linked a large middle class to the emergence and sustenance of democracy, whereas others have challenged this relationship.

In "Non-Modernization" (2022), Daron Acemoglu and James A. Robinson argue that modernization theory cannot account for various paths of political development "because it posits a link between economics and politics that is not conditional on institutions and culture and that presumes a definite endpoint—for example, an 'end of history'."

A meta-analysis by Gerardo L. Munck of research on Lipset's argument shows that a majority of studies do not support the thesis that higher levels of economic development leads to more democracy.

Classes, cleavages and alliances  

Sociologist Barrington Moore Jr., in his influential Social Origins of Dictatorship and Democracy (1966), argues that the distribution of power among classes – the peasantry, the bourgeoise and the landed aristocracy – and the nature of alliances between classes determined whether democratic, authoritarian or communist revolutions occurred. Moore also argued there were at least "three routes to the modern world" - the liberal democratic, the fascist, and the communist - each deriving from the timing of industrialization and the social structure at the time of transition. Thus, Moore challenged modernization theory, by stressing that there was not one path to the modern world and that economic development did not always bring about democracy.

Many authors have questioned parts of Moore's arguments. Dietrich Rueschemeyer, Evelyne Stephens, and John D. Stephens, in Capitalist Development and Democracy (1992), raise questions about Moore's analysis of the role of the bourgeoisie in democratization. Eva Bellin argues that under certain circumstances, the bourgeoise and labor are more likely to favor democratization, but less so under other circumstances. Samuel Valenzuela argues that, counter to Moore's view, the landed elite supported democratization in Chile. A comprehensive assessment conducted by James Mahoney concludes that "Moore's specific hypotheses about democracy and authoritarianism receive only limited and highly conditional support."

A 2020 study linked democratization to the mechanization of agriculture: as landed elites became less reliant on the repression of agricultural workers, they became less hostile to democracy.

According to political scientist David Stasavage, representative government is "more likely to occur when a society is divided across multiple political cleavages." A 2021 study found that constitutions that emerge through pluralism (reflecting distinct segments of society) are more likely to induce liberal democracy (at least, in the short term).

Political-economic factors

Rulers' need for taxation 
Robert Bates and Donald Lien, as well as David Stasavage, have argued that rulers' need for taxes gave asset-owning elites the bargaining power to demand a say on public policy, thus giving rise to democratic institutions. Montesquieu argued that the mobility of commerce meant that rulers had to bargain with merchants in order to tax them, otherwise they would lead the country or hide their commercial activities. Stasavage argues that the small size and backwardness of European states, as well as the weakness of European rulers, after the fall of the Roman Empire meant that European rulers had to obtain consent from their population to govern effectively.

According to Clark, Golder, and Golder, an application of  Albert O. Hirschman's exit, voice, and loyalty model is that if individuals have plausible exit options, then a government may be more likely to democratize. James C. Scott argues that governments may find it difficult to claim a sovereignty over a population when that population is in motion. Scott additionally asserts that exit may not solely include physical exit from the territory of a coercive state, but can include a number of adaptive responses to coercion that make it more difficult for states to claim sovereignty over a population. These responses can include planting crops that are more difficult for states to count, or tending livestock that are more mobile. In fact, the entire political arrangement of a state is a result of individuals adapting to the environment, and making a choice as to whether or not to stay in a territory. If people are free to move, then the exit, voice, and loyalty model predicts that a state will have to be of that population representative, and appease the populous in order to prevent them from leaving. If individuals have plausible exit options then they are better able to constrain a government's arbitrary behaviour through threat of exit.

Inequality and democracy 
Daron Acemoglu and James A. Robinson argued that the relationship between social equality and democratic transition is complicated: People have less incentive to revolt in an egalitarian society (for example, Singapore), so the likelihood of democratization is lower. In a highly unequal society (for example, South Africa under Apartheid), the redistribution of wealth and power in a democracy would be so harmful to elites that these would do everything to prevent democratization. Democratization is more likely to emerge somewhere in the middle, in the countries, whose elites offer concessions because (1) they consider the threat of a revolution credible and (2) the cost of the concessions is not too high. This expectation is in line with the empirical research showing that democracy is more stable in egalitarian societies.

Other approaches to the relationship between inequality and democracy have been presented by Carles Boix, Stephan Haggard and Robert Kaufman, and Ben Ansell and David Samuels.

In their 2019 book The Narrow Corridor and a 2022 study in the American Political Science Review, Acemoglu and Robinson argue that the nature of the relationship between elites and society determine whether stable democracy emerges. When elites are overly dominant, despotic states emerge. When society is overly dominant, weak states emerge. When elites and society are evenly balance, inclusive states emerge.

Natural resources 

Research shows that oil wealth lowers levels of democracy and strengthens autocratic rule. According to Michael Ross, petroleum is the sole resource that has "been consistently correlated with less democracy and worse institutions" and is the "key variable in the vast majority of the studies" identifying some type of resource curse effect. A 2014 meta-analysis confirms the negative impact of oil wealth on democratization.

Thad Dunning proposes a plausible explanation for Ecuador's return to democracy that contradicts the conventional wisdom that natural resource rents encourage authoritarian governments. Dunning proposes that there are situations where natural resource rents, such as those acquired through oil, reduce the risk of distributive or social policies to the elite because the state has other sources of revenue to finance this kind of policies that is not the elite wealth or income. And in countries plagued with high inequality, which was the case of Ecuador in the 1970s, the result would be a higher likelihood of democratization. In 1972, the military coup had overthrown the government in large part because of the fears of elites that redistribution would take place. That same year oil became an increasing financial source for the country. Although the rents were used to finance the military, the eventual second oil boom of 1979 ran parallel to the country's re-democratization. Ecuador's re-democratization can then be attributed, as argued by Dunning, to the large increase of oil rents, which enabled not only a surge in public spending but placated the fears of redistribution that had grappled the elite circles. The exploitation of Ecuador's resource rent enabled the government to implement price and wage policies that benefited citizens at no cost to the elite and allowed for a smooth transition and growth of democratic institutions.

The thesis that oil and other natural resources have a negative impact on democracy has been challenged by historian Stephen Haber and political scientist Victor Menaldo in a widely cited article in the American Political Science Review (2011). Haber and Menaldo argue that "natural resource reliance is not an exogenous variable" and find that when tests of the relationship between natural resources and democracy take this point into account "increases in resource reliance are not associated with authoritarianism."

Cultural factors

Values and religion 
It is claimed by some that certain cultures are simply more conducive to democratic values than others. This view is likely to be ethnocentric. Typically, it is Western culture which is cited as "best suited" to democracy, with other cultures portrayed as containing values which make democracy difficult or undesirable. This argument is sometimes used by undemocratic regimes to justify their failure to implement democratic reforms. Today, however, there are many non-Western democracies. Examples include: India, Japan, Indonesia, Namibia, Botswana, Taiwan, and South Korea. Research finds that "Western-educated leaders significantly and substantively improve a country's democratization prospects".

Huntington presented an influential, but also controversial arguments about Confucianism and Islam. Huntington held that that "In practice Confucian or Confucian-influenced societies have been inhospitable to democracy." He also held that "Islamic doctrine ... contains elements that may be both congenial and uncongenial to democracy," but generally thought that Islam was an obstacle to democratization. In contrast, Alfred Stepan was more optimistic about the compatibility of different religions and democracy.

Steven Fish and Robert Barro have linked Islam to undemocratic outcomes. However, Michael Ross argues that the lack of democracies in some parts of the Muslim world has more to do with the adverse effects of the resource curse than Islam. Lisa Blaydes and Eric Chaney have linked the democratic divergence between the West and the Middle-East to the reliance on mamluks (slave soldiers) by Muslim rulers whereas European rulers had to rely on local elites for military forces, thus giving those elites bargaining power to push for representative government.

Robert Dahl argued, in On Democracy, that countries with a "democratic political culture" were more prone for democratization and democratic survival. He also argued that cultural homogeneity and smallness contribute to democratic survival. Other scholars have however challenged the notion that small states and homogeneity strengthen democracy.

A 2012 study found that areas in Africa with Protestant missionaries were more likely to become stable democracies. A 2020 study failed to replicate those findings.

Sirianne Dahlum and Carl Henrik Knutsen offer a test of the Ronald Inglehart and Christian Welzel revised version of modernization theory, which focuses on cultural traits triggered by economic development that are presummed to be conducive to democratization. They find "no empirical support" for the Inglehart and  Welzel thesis and conclude that "self-expression values do not enhance democracy levels or democratization chances, and neither do they stabilize existing democracies."

Education 
It has long been theorized that education promotes stable and democratic societies. Research shows that education leads to greater political tolerance, increases the likelihood of political participation and reduces inequality. One study finds "that increases in levels of education improve levels of democracy and that the democratizing effect of education is more intense in poor countries".

It is commonly claimed that democracy and democratization were important drivers of the expansion of primary education around the world. However, new evidence from historical education trends challenges this assertion. An analysis of historical student enrollment rates for 109 countries from 1820 to 2010 finds no support for the claim that democratization increased access to primary education around the world. It is true that transitions to democracy often coincided with an acceleration in the expansion of primary education, but the same acceleration was observed in countries that remained non-democratic.

Social capital and civil society 

Civil society refers to a collection of non-governmental organizations and institutions that advance the interests, priorities and will of citizens. Social capital refers to features of social life—networks, norms, and trust—that allow individuals to act together to pursue shared objectives.

Robert Putnam argues that certain characteristics make societies more likely to have cultures of civic engagement that lead to more participatory democracies. According to Putnam, communities with denser horizontal networks of civic association are able to better build the "norms of trust, reciprocity, and civic engagement" that lead to democratization and well-functioning participatory democracies. By contrasting communities in Northern Italy, which had dense horizontal networks, to communities in Southern Italy, which had more vertical networks and patron-client relations, Putnam asserts that the latter never built the culture of civic engagement that some deem as necessary for successful democratization.

Sheri Berman has rebutted Putnam's theory that civil society contributes to democratization, writing that in the case of the Weimar Republic, civil society facilitated the rise of the Nazi Party. According to Berman, Germany’s democratization after World War I allowed for a renewed development in the country’s civil society; however, Berman argues that this vibrant civil society eventually weakened democracy within Germany as it exacerbated existing social divisions due to the creation of exclusionary community organizations. Subsequent empirical research and theoretical analysis has lent support for Berman's argument. Yale University political scientist Daniel Mattingly argues civil society in China helps the authoritarian regime in China to cement control. Clark, M. Golder, and S. Golder also argue that despite many believing democratization requires a civic culture, empirical evidence produced by several reanalyses of past studies suggest this claim is only partially supported. Philippe C. Schmitter also asserts that the existence of civil society is not a prerequisite for the transition to democracy, but rather democratization is usually followed by the resurrection of civil society (even if it did not exist perviously).

Research indicates that democracy protests are associated with democratization. According to a study by Freedom House, in 67 countries where dictatorships have fallen since 1972, nonviolent civic resistance was a strong influence over 70 percent of the time. In these transitions, changes were catalyzed not through foreign invasion, and only rarely through armed revolt or voluntary elite-driven reforms, but overwhelmingly by democratic civil society organizations utilizing nonviolent action and other forms of civil resistance, such as strikes, boycotts, civil disobedience, and mass protests. A 2016 study found that about a quarter of all cases of democracy protests between 1989 and 2011 lead to democratization.

Military 
The military can serve as a domestic source of regime change, with the political identity of armed forces either encouraging their intervention in civilian politics or constraining them to remain on the political sidelines. This dynamic plays a key role in how militaries respond to democratization. It has been argued that, during El Salvador's transition from authoritarian rule, the military's domination within the political sphere constrained the consolidation of a civilian democratic regime. Similarly, in analyzing the role of Indonesia's military following the Suharto regime, it is recognized that dwifungsi, a document which legitimized the interference of armed forces in politics, acted as an obstacle to the country's democratization. The concordance between these case studies suggests that countries with a higher level of political autonomy tend to inhibit democratization.

Theories based on political agents and choices

Elite-opposition negotiations and contingency 
Scholars such as Dankwart A. Rustow, and Guillermo O'Donnell and Philippe C. Schmitter in their classic Transitions from Authoritarian Rule: Tentative Conclusions about Uncertain Democracies (1986), argued against the notion that there are structural "big" causes of democratization. These scholars instead emphasize how the democratization process occurs in a more contingent manner that depends on the characteristics and circumstances of the elites who ultimately oversee the shift from authoritarianism to democracy.

O'Donnell and Schmitter proposed a strategic choice approach to transitions to democracy that highlighted how they were driven by the decisions of different actors in response to a core set of dilemmas. The analysis centered on the interaction among four actors: the hard-liners and soft-liners who belonged to the incumbent authoritarian regime, and the moderate and radical oppositions against the regime. This book not only became the point of reference for a burgeoning academic literature on democratic transitions, it was also read widely by political activists engaged in actual struggles to achieve democracy.

Adam Przeworski, in Democracy and the Market (1991), offered the first analysis of the interaction between rulers and opposition in transitions to democracy using rudimentary game theory. and he emphasizes the interdependence of political and economic transformations.

Elite-driven democratization 
Scholars have argued that processes of democratization may be elite-driven or driven by the authoritarian incumbents as a way for those elites to retain power amid popular demands for representative government. If the costs of repression are higher than the costs of giving away power, authoritarians may opt for democratization and inclusive institutions. According to a 2020 study, authoritarian-led democratization is more likely to lead to lasting democracy in cases when the party strength of the authoritarian incumbent is high. However,  Michael Albertus and Victor Menaldo argue that democratizing rules implemented by outgoing authoritarians may distort democracy in favor of the outgoing authoritarian regime and its supporters, resulting in "bad" institutions that are hard to get rid of. According to Michael K. Miller, elite-driven democratization is particularly likely in the wake of major violent shocks (either domestic or international) which provide openings to opposition actors to the authoritarian regime. Dan Slater and Joseph Wong argue that dictators in Asia chose to implement democratic reforms when they were in positions of strength in order to retain and revitalize their power.

According to a study by political scientist Daniel Treisman, influential theories of democratization posit that autocrats "deliberately choose to share or surrender power. They do so to prevent revolution, motivate citizens to fight wars, incentivize governments to provide public goods, outbid elite rivals, or limit factional violence." His study shows that in many cases, "democratization occurred not because incumbent elites chose it but because, in trying to prevent it, they made mistakes that weakened their hold on power. Common mistakes include: calling elections or starting military conflicts, only to lose them; ignoring popular unrest and being overthrown; initiating limited reforms that get out of hand; and selecting a covert democrat as leader. These mistakes reflect well-known cognitive biases such as overconfidence and the illusion of control."

Sharun Mukand and Dani Rodrik dispute that elite-driven democratization produce liberal democracy. They argue that low levels of inequality and weak identity cleavages are necessary for liberal democracy to emerge. A 2020 study by several political scientists from German universities found that democratization through bottom-up peaceful protests led to higher levels of democracy and democratic stability than democratization prompted by elites.

In the transition from non-democracy to democracy, research shows that military dictatorships are more likely to become democracies. The three dictatorship types, monarchy, civilian and military have different approaches to democratization as a result of their individual goals. Monarchic and civilian dictatorships seek to remain in power indefinitely through hereditary rule in the case of monarchs or through oppression in the case of civilian dictators. A military dictatorship seizes power to act as a caretaker government to replace what they consider a flawed civilian government. Military dictatorships are more likely to transition to democracy because at the onset, they are meant to be stop-gap solutions while a new acceptable government forms. The modal pattern of transition from these regimes is negotiation, which aligns well with the establishment of democracy, usually achieved through negotiation. Since 1945, 31% of transitions from military rule have resulted in stable, long-lived democracies, in contrast with the 16% resulting from personalist authoritarian regimes. The largely peaceful transition from military dictatorship to civilian democracy in Mali is one example of a regime that successfully underwent a transition from military authoritarianism to democracy.

The military itself can serve as a domestic source of regime change. The political identity of armed forces either encouraging their intervention in civilian politics or constraining them to remain on the political sidelines. The extent to which Individuals in the armed forces attribute their position to their political identity determines how the collective will respond to democratization. Political Identity is defined as the way individuals characterize themselves and others.Identity becomes politicized when a group mobilizes to advance interests of or defend perceived threats to their groups, It shapes what individuals want the government to do. When looking at the transition from authoritarianism to democracy, a military's collective political identity plays a significant role in the way that they respond to democratization. Knut Walter and Phillip James argue that during El Salvador's transition from authoritarian rule, the military's domination within the political sphere constrained the consolidation of a civilian democratic regime. Similarly, in analyzing the role of Indonesia's military following the Suharto regime, Jun Honna recognized that dwi fungsi, a doctrine which legitimized the interference of armed forces in politics, acted as an obstacle to the country's democratization. The concordance between these case studies and findings from other countries suggests that countries with a higher level of political autonomy tend to inhibit democratization.

Research suggests that the threat of civil conflict encourages regimes to make democratic concessions. A 2016 study found that drought-induced riots in Sub-Saharan Africa lead regimes, fearing conflict, to make democratic concessions.

Scrambled constituencies 
Mancur Olson theorizes that the process of democratization occurs when elites are unable to reconstitute an autocracy.  Olson suggests that this occurs when constituencies or identity groups are mixed within a geographic region. He asserts that this mixed geographic constituencies requires elites to for democratic and representative institutions to control the region, and to limit the power of competing elite groups.

Death or ouster of dictator 
One analysis found that "Compared with other forms of leadership turnover in autocracies—such as coups, elections, or term limits—which lead to regime collapse about half of the time, the death of a dictator is remarkably inconsequential. ...  of the 79 dictators who have died in office (1946–2014)... in the vast majority (92%) of cases, the regime persists after the autocrat's death."

International factors

War and national security 
Jeffrey Herbst, in his paper "War and the State in Africa" (1990), explains how democratization in European states was achieved through political development fostered by war-making and these "lessons from the case of Europe show that war is an important cause of state formation that is missing in Africa today." Herbst writes that war and the threat of invasion by neighbors caused European state to more efficiently collect revenue, forced leaders to improve administrative capabilities, and fostered state unification and a sense of national identity (a common, powerful association between the state and its citizens). Herbst writes that in Africa and elsewhere in the non-European world "states are developing in a fundamentally new environment" because they mostly "gained Independence without having to resort to combat and have not faced a security threat since independence." Herbst notes that the strongest non-European states, South Korea and Taiwan, are "largely 'warfare' states that have been molded, in part, by the near constant threat of external aggression."

Elizabeth Kier has challenged claims that total war prompts democratization, showing in the cases of the UK and Italy during World War I that the policies adopted by the Italian government during World War I prompted a fascist backlash whereas UK government policies towards labor undermined broader democratization.

War and peace 

Wars may contribute to the state-building that precedes a transition to democracy, but war is mainly a serious obstacle to democratization. While adherents of the democratic peace theory believe that democracy causes peace, the territorial peace theory makes the opposite claim that peace causes democracy. In fact, war and territorial threats to a country are likely to increase authoritarianism and lead to autocracy. This is supported by historical evidence showing that in almost all cases, peace has come before democracy. A number of scholars have argued that there is little support for the hypothesis that democracy causes peace, but strong evidence for the opposite hypothesis that peace leads to democracy.

Christian Welzel's human empowerment theory posits that existential security leads to emancipative cultural values and support for a democratic political organization. This is in agreement with theories based on evolutionary psychology. The so-called regality theory finds that people develop a psychological preference for a strong leader and an authoritarian form of government in situations of war or perceived collective danger. On the other hand, people will support egalitarian values and a preference for democracy in situations of peace and safety. The consequence of this is that a society will develop in the direction of autocracy and an authoritarian government when people perceive collective danger, while the development in the democratic direction requires collective safety.

International institutions 
A number of studies have found that international institutions have helped facilitate democratization. Thomas Risse wrote in 2009, "there is a consensus in the literature on Eastern Europe that the EU membership perspective had a huge anchoring effects for the new democracies." Scholars have also linked NATO expansion with playing a role in democratization. International forces can significantly affect democratization. Global forces like the diffusion of democratic ideas and pressure from international financial institutions to democratize have led to democratization.

Promotion, and foreign influence and intervention 

The European Union has contributed to the spread of democracy, in particular by encouraging democratic reforms in aspiring member states. Thomas Risse wrote in 2009, "there is a consensus in the literature on Eastern Europe that the EU membership perspective had a huge anchoring effects for the new democracies."

Steven Levitsky and Lucan Way have argued that close ties to the West increased the likelihood of democratization after the end of the Cold War, whereas states with weak ties to the West adopted competitive authoritarian regimes.

A 2002 study found that membership in regional organizations "is correlated with transitions to democracy during the period from 1950 to 1992."

A 2004 study found no evidence that foreign aid led to democratization.

Democracies have often been imposed by military intervention, for example in Japan and Germany after World War II. In other cases, decolonization sometimes facilitated the establishment of democracies that were soon replaced by authoritarian regimes. For example, Syria, after gaining independence from French mandatory control at the beginning of the Cold War, failed to consolidate its democracy, so it eventually collapsed and was replaced by a Ba'athist dictatorship.

Robert Dahl argued in On Democracy that foreign interventions contributed to democratic failures, citing Soviet interventions in Central and Eastern Europe and U.S. interventions in Latin America. However, the delegitimization of empires contributed to the emergence of democracy as former colonies gained independence and implemented democracy.

Geographic factors 
Some scholars link the emergence and sustenance of democracies to areas with access to the sea, which tends to increase the mobility of people, goods, capital, and ideas.

Historical factors

Historical legacies 
In seeking to explain why North America developed stable democracies and Latin America did not, Seymour Martin Lipset, in The Democratic Century (2004), holds that the reason is that the initial patterns of colonization, the subsequent process of economic incorporation of the new colonies, and the wars of independence differ. The divergent histories of Britain and Iberia are seen as creating different cultural legacies that affected the prospects of democracy. A related argument is presented by James A. Robinson in "Critical Junctures and Developmental Paths" (2022).

Sequencing 
Scholars have discussed whether the order in which things happen helps or hinders the process of democratization. An early discussion occurred in the 1960s and 1970s. Dankwart Rustow argued that "'the most effective sequence' is the pursuit of national unity, government authority, and political equality, in that order." Eric Nordlinger and Samuel Huntington stressed "the importance of developing effective governmental institutions before the emergence of mass participation in politics." Robert Dahl, in Polyarchy: Participation and Opposition (1971), held that the "commonest sequence among the older and more stable polyarchies has been some approximation of the ... path [in which] competitive politics preceded expansion in participation."

In the 2010s, the discusion focused on the impact of the sequencing between state building and democratization. Francis Fukuyama, in Political Order and Political Decay (2014), echoes Huntington's "state-first" argument and holds that those "countries in which democracy preceded modern state-building have had much greater problems achieving high-quality governance." This view has been supported by Sheri Berman, who offers a sweeping overview of European history and concludes that "sequencing matters" and that "without strong states .. liberal democracy is difficult if not impossible to achieve."

However, this state-first thesis has been challenged. Relying on a comparison of Denmark and Greece, and quantitative research on 180 countries across 1789–2019, Haakon Gjerløw, Carl Henrik Knutsen, Tore Wig, and Matthew C. Wilson, in One Road to Riches? (2022), "find little evidence to support the stateness-first argument." Based on a comparison of European and Latin American countries, Sebastián Mazzuca and Gerardo Munck, in A Middle-Quality Institutional Trap (2021), argue that counter to the state-first thesis, the "starting point of political developments is less important than whether the State–democracy relationship is a virtuous cycle, triggering causal mechanisms that reinforce each."

Critiques related to gender and race

Gender and waves of democratization 
One of the critiques of Huntington's periodization is that it "ignores the requirement of universal suffrage." Relatedly, as Pamela Paxton showed, "when women are included in measures of democracy, the notion of waves of democracy (Huntington 1991) is no longer strongly supported." Paxton shows that once women's suffrage is taken into account, the data reveal "a long, continuous democratization period from 1893-1958, with only war-related reversals."

Gender and race in theories of democratization 
Two broad problems have been identified in theories of democratization. Georgina Waylen has argued that the lack of a gendered approach has been a glaring problem. Michael Hanchard, in The Spectre of Race (2018), provides a thorough review of the literature and holds that theories have not adequately acknowledged how ethno-national and racial hierarchies shape the process and prospects of democratization.

References

Further reading

Key works 
 Acemoglu, Daron, and James A. Robinson. 2006. Economic Origins of Dictatorship and Democracy. New York, NY: Cambridge University Press.
 Albertus, Michael and Victor Menaldo. 2018. Authoritarianism and the Elite Origins of Democracy. New York: Cambridge University Press.
 Berman, Sheri. 2019. Democracy and Dictatorship in Europe: From the Ancien Régime to the Present Day. New York: Oxford University Press.
 Boix, Carles. 2003. Democracy and Redistribution. New York: Cambridge University Press
 Brancati, Dawn. 2016. Democracy Protests: Origins, Features and Significance. New York: Cambridge University Press
 Carothers, Thomas. 1999. Aiding Democracy Abroad: The Learning Curve. Washington, DC: Carnegie Endowment for International Peace.
 Collier, Ruth Berins. 1999. Paths Toward Democracy: Working Class and Elites in Western Europe and South America. New York: Cambridge University Press
 Coppedge, Michael, Amanda Edgell, Carl Henrik Knutsen, and Staffan I. Lindberg (eds.). 2022. Why Democracies Develop and Decline. New York, NY: Cambridge University Press.
 Fukuyama, Francis. 2014. Political Order and Political Decay. From the Industrial Revolution to the Globalization of Democracy. New York: Farrar, Straus and Giroux.
 Haggard, Stephen and Robert Kaufman. 2016. Dictators and Democrats: Elites, Masses, and Regime Change. Princeton, NJ: Princeton University Press.
 Inglehart, Ronald and Christian Welzel. 2005. Modernization, Cultural Change and Democracy: The Human Development Sequence. New York: Cambridge University Press.
 Hadenius, Axel. 2001. Institutions and Democratic Citizenship. Oxford: Oxford University Press.
 Levitsky, Steven, and Lucan A. Way. 2010. Competitive Authoritarianism: Hybrid Regimes After the Cold War. New York, NY: Cambridge University Press.
 Linz, Juan J., and Alfred Stepan. 1996. Problems of Democratic Transition and Consolidation: Southern Europe, South America and Post-Communist Europe. Baltimore, MD: The Johns Hopkins University Press.
 Lipset, Seymour Martin. 1959. "Some Social Requisites of Democracy: Economic Development and Political Legitimacy." American Political Science Review 53(1): 69-105.
 Mainwaring, Scott, and Aníbal Pérez-Liñán. 2014. Democracies and Dictatorships in Latin America. Emergence, Survival, and Fall. New York: Cambridge University Press.
 Møller, Jørgen and Svend-Erik Skaaning (eds.). 2016. The State-Democracy Nexus. Conceptual Distinctions, Theoretical Perspectives, and Comparative Approaches. London: Routledge.
 O'Donnell, Guillermo, and Philippe C. Schmitter. 1986. Transitions from Authoritarian Rule. Tentative Conclusions about Uncertain Democracies. Baltimore, MD: The Johns Hopkins University Press. 
 Przeworski, Adam. 1991. Democracy and the Market. Political and Economic Reforms in Eastern Europe and Latin America. New York, NY: Cambridge University Press.
 Przeworski, Adam, Michael E. Alvarez, José Antonio Cheibub, and Fernando Limongi. 2000. Democracy and Development: Political Institutions and Well-Being in the World, 1950-1990. New York, NY: Cambridge University Press.
 Rosenfeld, Bryn. 2020. The Autocratic Middle Class: How State Dependency Reduces the Demand for Democracy. Princeton, NJ, Princeton University Press.
 Schaffer, Frederic C. Democracy in Translation: Understanding Politics in an Unfamiliar Culture. 1998. Ithaca, NY: Cornell University Press.
 Teele, Dawn Langan. 2018. Forging the Franchise: The Political Origins of the Women's Vote. Princeton, NJ: Princeton University Press.
 Teorell, Jan. 2010. Determinants of Democratization: Explaining Regime Change in the World, 1972 -2006. New York, NY: Cambridge University Press.
 Tilly, Charles. 2004. Contention and Democracy in Europe, 1650-2000. New York: Cambridge University Press.
 Tilly, Charles. 2007. Democracy. New York: Cambridge University Press.
 Vanhanen, Tatu. 2003. Democratization: A Comparative Analysis of 170 Countries. Routledge.
 Welzel, Christian. 2013. Freedom Rising: Human Empowerment and the Quest for Emancipation. New York: Cambridge University Press. 
 Weyland, Kurt. 2014. Making Waves: Democratic Contention in Europe and Latin America since the Revolutions of 1848. New York: Cambridge University Press
 Zakaria, Fareed. The Future of Freedom: Illiberal Democracy at Home and Abroad. 2003. New York: W.W. Norton.
 Ziblatt, Daniel. 2017. Conservative Parties and the Birth of Democracy. New York: Cambridge University Press.

Overviews of the research 
 Bunce, Valerie. 2000. "Comparative Democratization: Big and Bounded Generalizations." Comparative Political Studies 33(6-7): 703-34.
 Cheibub, José Antonio, and James Raymond Vreeland. 2018. "Modernization Theory: Does Economic Development Cause Democratization?" pp. 3–21, in Carol Lancaster and Nicolas van de Walle (eds.), Oxford Handbook of the Politics of Development. New York, NY: Oxford University Press.
 Coppedge, Michael. 2012. Democratization and Research Methods. New York, NY: Cambridge University Press.
 Geddes, Barbara. 1999.  "What Do We Know About Democratization After Twenty Years?" Annual Review of Political Science 2:1, 115-144. 
 Mazzuca, Sebastián. 2010. "Macrofoundations of Regime Change: Democracy, State Formation, and Capitalist Development." Comparative Politics 43(1): 1-19.
 Møller, Jørgen, and Svend-Erik Skaaning. 2013. Democracy and Democratization in Comparative Perspective: Conceptions, Conjunctures, Causes and Consequences. London, UK: Routledge.
 Munck, Gerardo L. 2015. "Democratic Transitions," pp. 97–100, in James D. Wright (ed.), International Encyclopedia of the Social and Behavioral Sciences 2nd edn., Vol. 6. Oxford, UK: Elsevier Science.
 Potter, David. 1997. "Explaining Democratization," pp. 1–40, in David Potter, David Goldblatt, Margaret Kiloh, and Paul Lewis (eds.), Democratization. Cambridge, UK: Polity Press and The Open University.
 Welzel, Christian. 2009. "Theories of Democratization," pp. 74–91, in Christian W. Haerpfer, Patrick Bernhagen, Ronald F. Inglehart, and Christian Welzel (eds.), Democratization. Oxford, UK: Oxford University Press.
 Wucherpfennig, Julian, and Franziska Deutsch. 2009. "Modernization and Democracy: Theories and Evidence Revisited." Living Reviews in Democracy Vol. 1, p. 1-9. 9p.

External links

International IDEA (International Institute for Democracy and Electoral Assistance)
Muno, Wolfgang. 2012. "Democratization". InterAmerican Wiki: Terms - Concepts - Critical Perspectives.

Comparative politics
 
Political terminology
Politics
Democracy
Law reform
Global politics